Ngahtatgyi Buddha Temple is a Buddhist temple in Bahan Township, Yangon, Burma, located off Shwegondine Road.

References

External links

Buddhist temples in Yangon